Asfaranjan or Esfaranjan may refer to:
 Asfaranjan, Ardabil
 Esfaranjan, Isfahan
 Esfaranjan, Shahreza, Isfahan Province